Already Platinum is the debut album by American rapper Slim Thug. The album was released on July 12, 2005 on Pharrell and Chad Hugo's Star Trak label. The original release date was slated for February 2005, but heavy bootlegging and numerous delays held the album back, forcing a vast majority of its original track listing to be replaced. The original track listing included the original version of the track "I Ain't Heard of That," which featured Jay-Z.

In an interview with XXL, the rapper explained the album title does not suggest he will go platinum, but that his lifestyle (before he got a record deal) was already similar to that of rappers who had reached the platinum status. In an interview on The Tyra Banks Show, mentor Pharrell revealed that he was a millionaire before the two met, and he especially liked that about him. He continued to say that he was "already platinum," the album name was just in confirmation of this.

The album debuted at number 2 on the Billboard 200 with 130,000 copies sold in the first week released. Since then the album has sold over 500,000 copies.

Background 
In a 2016 interview with Slim Thug, he alleged to have met the albums executive producer Pharrell Williams in Houston prior to career a mentorship arranged by Jimmy Iovine, as both acts were signed to Interscope Records at the time. Slim Thug alleged to having recorded a bulk of album in Los Angeles; Williams played a then-unreleased remix to Jay-Z's 2003 single "Change Clothes" (which Williams also produced), which was later reworked and became the song "I Ain't Heard of That". The song was also supposed to keep a verse performed by Jay-Z as a guest feature, however once the song became heavily bootlegged, the verse was replaced by fellow Houston rapper Bun B. Jay-Z received a formal songwriting credit on the song, despite Slim Thug alleging that Williams wrote the chorus.

Critical reception 

Already Platinum garnered a positive reception from music critics who praised Slim's vocal delivery and the Southern production. AllMusic's Andy Kellman praised Slim's delivery for being more charismatic than Lil' Flip and Mike Jones, and the production work from both Mr. Lee and The Neptunes, concluding that "Already Platinum is one of 2005's best rap albums." Evan McGarvey of Stylus Magazine praised the Neptunes' production for evolving with Slim's Southern drawl and delivery, concluding that "After years of singles that people called "infectious" and "club-ready," they take Slim Thug and his dashing uniqueness and carve diamonds. This [album] isn't a musical highlight reel, it's watching artists shuck off personal curses and step into their own skins." Vibe contributor Rondell Conway wrote that, "Slim's worldly sensibilities make the pensive moments on the album both heartfelt ("Dedicate") and heady ("The Interview"). All the while, he keeps his Teflon status intact–without telling any tall tales." Rolling Stones Christian Hoard called the record "a popwise bastardization of the Houston rap scene's round-the-way charm", praising Slim's "down-home brassiness" delivering "brawny boasts and mesmerizing refrains", and the Neptunes' "arty minimalism" being better than on previous outings.

Entertainment Weekly writer Michael Endelman gave note of Slim having a "steady, linebacker-strong flow and [a] baritone" throughout the album but gave credit to the Neptunes for giving him "spacious and stark beats that are equal parts frightening and funky". Steve Jones of USA Today said that big names like T.I. and Jazze Pha didn't turn the attention away from the main artist, saying that "Slim [Thug]'s confident, laid-back deliveries keep him from being overshadowed." Chris Ryan of Spin commended Slim for lending his voice to the Neptunes' atmospheric production, saying they "contribute some of their most adventurous work yet." Tom Breihan of Pitchfork was critical of most of the tracks by the Neptunes, saying they "lost the gleaming, clattering swagger they once had, relying instead on bloodless synth lines and itchy, nattering drums" and that Slim's performance on them suffered. But said that the tracks by Mr. Lee ("Diamonds" and "3 Kings") were the highlights, concluding that, "On tracks like this, Slim sounds prehistoric, like he's always existed, like this voice has been echoing over canyons and through caves since before time began."

Track listing 

Sample credits
"3 Kings", samples "Secretary" by Betty Wright.
"Diamonds", samples "Top Notch Hoes" by Pimp C.
"The Interview", samples "The Newness Is Gone" by Eddie Kendricks.
"Miss Mary", samples "A Moment with You" by George Michael.
"I Need A...", samples  "Out There" by Willie Hutch.
"Dope Man", samples "Just to Keep You Satisfied" by Marvin Gaye.
"I'll Show Ya", samples "Stay in Love with Me" by Trinere

Personnel 
Credits for Already Platinum adapted from AllMusic.

Leslie Braithwaite - mixing
Bobby Brown - mixing
Willie Clarke - composer
George Clinton, Jr. - composer
Andrew Coleman - engineer
W. O. Collins - composer
G. Cooper - composer
Danielle Demmerella - marketing coordinator
Jan Fairchild - mixing
Allan Felder - composer
Ashley Fox - marketing
Sarah A. Friedman - photography
Mike Frost - art direction, photography
Brian "Big Bass" Gardner - mastering
Brian Garten - engineer
Mark "Exit" Goodchild - engineer
Hart Gunther - assistant
Clifford Harris - composer
Norman Harris - composer
Jaycen Joshua - engineer
General Johnson - composer

Jahaun Johnson - A&R, executive producer
Killa Kyleon - composer
Anthony Mandler - cover photo, photography
Manny Marroquin - mixing
George Michael - composer
Kyla Miller - engineer
The Neptunes - executive producer
Barney Perkins - composer
Gregg Perry - composer
Nicole Plantin - A&R
Clarence Reid - composer
April Roomet - stylist
Justin Shtturtz - assistant
Shawn Suggs - A&R
Phil Tan - mixing
S. Thomas - composer
Terrence Thornton - composer
Richard Travali - mixing
Patrick Viala - mixing
Rob Walker - executive producer
James M. Wisner - assistant

Charts

Weekly charts

Year-end charts

Certifications

References 

2005 debut albums
Slim Thug albums
Geffen Records albums
Star Trak Entertainment albums
Albums produced by the Neptunes
Albums produced by Cool & Dre
Albums produced by Jazze Pha